Stictonaclia reducta is a moth in the subfamily Arctiinae. It was described by Paul Mabille in 1878. It is found on Madagascar.

References

Moths described in 1878
Arctiinae